Tullibardine Castle was a castle located in the village of Tullibardine,  north of Auchterarder in Perth and Kinross, Scotland.

History
The lands of Tullibardine passed to the Murray family after Ada de Strathearn, the wife of William Murray, was granted the other moiety of Tullibardine from her aunty. The castle was built in the late 13th to early 14th century, with likely its first custodian being David Murray, Baron of Tullibardine.

One early Murray owner of the castle was said to have had seventeen sons. The king thought he had broken the law by having an armed retinue. The brothers were said to have slept in a large round room in the castle, their heads placed against a central pillar.

The outline of the ship, the Great Michael, commissioned by James IV, was commemorated by a plantation of hawthorn hedges at Tullibardine. This could be seen in the 1570s, according to a chronicle writer, Robert Lindsay of Pitscottie. The probable site of this garden feature can be seen in aerial photographs about 100 metres north of the castle site.

Mary, Queen of Scots, visited William Murray of Tullibardine at the castle on 16 November 1562, and on 31 December 1566.

James VI and the masque at Tullibardine
James VI often visited John Murray, 1st Earl of Tullibardine, whose roles at court included Master of the Household. James came from Huntingtower Castle, then known as Ruthven Castle in August 1584, when there was a plague scare in Perth.

James and Anne of Denmark attended the wedding of Lilias Murray and John Grant of Freuchie on 21 June 1591 at Tullibardine. James VI performed in a masque, dancing with his valet, probably John Wemyss of Logie. They wore Venetian carnival masks and helmets with red and pink taffeta costumes. The original account of fabrics supplied to the king's tailor, written in the Scots language, includes:Item, the 18 of June deliverit to Allexander Miller 8 ellis of incarnedin Spainze (Spanish) taffetye to be ane stand of maskerie clayths to his majestie att the mariage of the laird of Tillebarne dochter att £7 the elle, £56.Item 8 elles of incarnet taffetie to be ane stand of maskerye clayths to hym that wes his majesties vallet att thatt tyme, £24.

James VI was at Tullibardine for New Year in 1592. He stayed again on 7 January 1594.

The castle was demolished in 1883.

See also
Tullibardine Chapel

References
Coventry, Martin (2010). Castles of the Clans. Musselburgh : Goblinshead. 

Ruined castles in Perth and Kinross
Clan Murray
Demolished buildings and structures in Scotland
Buildings and structures demolished in 1883